Abhanpur Junction railway station is a main narrow-gauge railway junction in Raipur district, Chhattisgarh. Its code is AVP. It serves Abhanpur city. The station consists of 2 platforms. The station lies on the Raipur–Dhamtari branch line as well as Abhanpur–Rajim branch line of Bilaspur–Nagpur section.

Major trains

 Kendri–Dhamtari NG Passenger
 Abhanpur–Rajim NG Passenger
 Rajim–Kendri NG Passenger

References

Railway stations in Raipur district
Raipur railway division